UFINET is a multinational telecommunications company headquartered in Madrid, Spain. It operates a Tier 2 network.

History
UFINET is a neutral, carrier of carrier's telecom company, created by Unión Fenosa (formerly known as Unión Fenosa Redes de Telecomunicación) in 1998. In 2009, it merged with the company Desarrollo de Cable, which belonged to the company Gas Natural, and this gave rise to Gas Natural Fenosa Telecomunicaciones (GNF Telecom). In 2014, CINVEN, an investment fund of private capital acquired the GNFT. The acquisition was carried out for a total of 510 million Euros. Since then, the company has traded as UFINET. In June 2018, ENEL acquired 21% of the company, while Cinven kept the remaining 79%  Under the agreement, Enel X International has the right to exercise a call option to acquire the Sixth Cinven Fund’s stake between December 31st, 2020 and December 31st, 2021.

Business areas
UFINET provides telecommunication services through more than 70,000km of fiber optic network. Among the services provided are Fiber optic, data transmission, Internet service provider, co-location center, Ethernet (E-Line, E-Access, E-LAN, E-Tree), PDH/SDH7/SONET, Dark Fiber, Internet (DIA, SOHO), VSAT (Satellite services), FTTH (Fiber to the Home), Towering, Layer 3 services, Direct cloud connectivity and other services (CPE Lease, Remote Hands, etc.). UFINET is a MEF Carrier Ethernet 3.0 (CE 3.0) certified for E-LINE, E-LAN, E-TREE and E-ACCESS capacity services.

Countries covered
UFINET currently has a presence in Mexico, Guatemala, Honduras, El Salvador, Nicaragua, Costa Rica, Panamá, Colombia, Ecuador, Peru, Brazil, Paraguay, Argentina and Chile. It also uses the facilities of data center providers such as CoreSite, providing network access points (NAP) in the Americas, New York, Los Angeles and Dominican Republic.

References

External links
Ufinet
Unión Fenosa
Servicios Satelitales de Ufinet
Cinven
Enel

Multinational companies headquartered in Spain
Telecommunications companies of South America
Companies based in Madrid